Bolachen (the stress is on the second syllable; the "e" is also sounded) is a traditional card game for 3 players that is played in Upper Bavaria. It is threatened by extinction.

History 
The origin of Bolachen is not exactly clear; today, it is mainly found in southern Upper Bavaria. However, like the similar but more complex Wallachen, it is rarely played anymore and is thus threatened with extinction. It is probably the variant or synonym of Préférence described by Geiser as "Polachen", especially as the unusual suit order is identical with that of Préférence. In which case, the name means playing [the game of] Polack, Polachen being a derivative of Polacke, an old German word for a Pole, derived in turn from Polak, the Polish word for Pole. The game may therefore be of Polish origin. The terminology for the contracts - Brand, Bettel and Mord - may be derived from the old German game of Brandeln.

Cards

Suits 
Bolachen, like Schafkopf, is played with a German pack of Bavarian pattern cards. These are usually marketed under the name Tarock/ Schafkopf and contain 36 cards. For Wallachen and many other Bavarian card games the Sixes are removed.

When determining the soloist (also called the declarer), the suits rank in the same order as in Préférence (in a Brand contract):

Hearts > Bells > Leaves > Acorns

Card ranking 

The ranking of cards for trick-taking is:

Sow (Ace) > King > Ober > Unter > 10 > 9 > 8 > 7

Aim 
The aim for the declarer is to win his chosen contract – in a normal game (Brand) by taking six of the ten tricks; in a Bettel by losing every trick and in a Mord by winning every trick. The aim of the two defenders is to thwart the declarer. Like Wallachen, it is usually played for small monetary stakes, which enables, for example, a limit to be set as the winner's target.

Playing

Dealing 

The dealer shuffles the cards and deals the cards as follows: first, a packet of three to each player; next, two cards to the dopper (equivalent to a skat); then a packet of four to each player; and finally another packet of three. (Thus 30 cards are divided among the 3 players and two go to the dopper.)

The dealer rotates clockwise with each hand.

Contracts and bidding 
There are basically three different ways in which the players attempt to win a game:

 Brand: the declarer has to take six tricks. One suit is nominated as trumps by the declarer himself (value: one unit).
 Bettel: the declarer must not take any tricks to win (value: 2 units, no trumps).
 Mord: in this contract the declarer must take all the tricks to win (value: 3 units, no trumps).

The player to the left of the dealer is the first to announce what he will play or to pass. The next player does likewise. If neither wants to play a game, then the dealer has to do so. The following rules apply:
 One player becomes the declarer; this is the player who has chosen the highest-value contract. The contracts rank as follows: Mord > Bettel > Heart Brand > Bell Brand > Leaf Brand > Acorn Brand.
 If two players want to play a contract of the same value, the player who announced it first, i.e. is the nearest to the dealer’s left, has priority
 In the normal case, a player does not have to nominate the trump suit until he has picked up the dopper. If more than one player wants to bid a Brand, the trump suit must be determined beforehand, after that the player may only switch to a higher value suit or contract (Bettel or Mord).

Game start and play 
Once the declarer has been determined, he may view the dopper and, if he wishes, exchange one or both of these cards for one or two of his own cards. However, the hand must always contain 10 cards to start the game. An exception to picking up the dopper occurs if Mord or Bettel is played. Then the declarer may call for a card from another player, which that player has to exchange with the declarer for a card of his choice. Only after that, may cards be exchanged with the dopper.

Now a normal series of trick taking begins, as in Watten or other games, until all the cards are "used up". Naturally, the player who wins the trick always leads to the next trick or, in the case of the first trick, it is the declarer who leads.
However, there are important features of Bolachen:
 Trump cards are only used in Brand; otherwise the highest card of the led suit wins.
 Suit must be followed: if Leaves have been led, players must follow with Leaves (unless they do not have any).
 However, the above rule only applies as long as the card has not yet been beaten. If it has already been headed by a fellow defender with whom you are playing against the declarer, you do not have to follow suit (to avoid wasting trump cards).

When all cards are "used up", if the declarer wins the other players must pay him the value of the contract; and vice versa if the declarer loses.

Scoring 
The game uses the same scoring system as Wallachen. If playing for soft score, players record their positive and negative scores on a scoresheet. In a Brand the declarer scores +2 for a win and -2 for losing; the defenders score -1 and +1 each respectively. These scores are doubled for a Bettel and tripled in a Mord.

When playing for hard score, if the tariff is 10¢, the declarer earns 10¢ from each defender for winning a Brand or pays 10¢ to each one for losing. These payments are doubled in the case of a Bettel and trebled for a Mord. Sometimes a Mord is paid at 50¢ instead of 30¢.

References

Literature

See also 
 Wallachen

Preference group
German deck card games
Bavarian card games
Three-player card games